Tuisugaletaua Sofara Aveau (born ~1953) is a Samoan politician and former Cabinet Minister.

Aveau was a musician. He was first elected to the Legislative Assembly of Samoa in the 2001 election, and was appointed Minister of Agriculture. He was re-elected in the 2006 election and appointed Minister of Works, Transport and Infrastructure. As Minister of Transport he spearheaded the government campaign to change Samoa from left-hand to right-hand driving.

Following the 2011 election he stood unsuccessfully for Deputy leader of the HRPP. He was subsequently appointed Minister of Communications, Information and Technology. In November 2011 he was investigated for assault by police; the complaint was later withdrawn. In 2014 he and his wife composed the theme song for the United Nations Third International Conference on Small Island Developing States.

He lost his seat in the 2016 election. Following his election loss he established the Samoa Banana Farmers Association. He contested the 2021 election as an HRPP candidate, but was unsuccessful.

References

Living people
Members of the Legislative Assembly of Samoa
Government ministers of Samoa
Human Rights Protection Party politicians
Year of birth missing (living people)